Section 375: Marzi Ya Zabardasti?, better known simply as Section 375, is a 2019 Indian Hindi-language legal thriller film produced by Kumar Mangat Pathak, Abhishek Pathak and SCIPL, written by Manish Gupta with Ajay Bahl and directed by Ajay Bahl. It is based on Section 375 of the Indian Penal Code laws in India. 

The film stars Akshaye Khanna, Richa Chadda, Meera Chopra and Rahul Bhat. Principal photography of the film began in January 2019.

The film was theatrically released in India on 13 September 2019. The film opened to low numbers on opening day and was declared "average" at the box office.

Plot 
Notable film director Rohan Khurana (Rahul Bhat) is arrested and convicted by a sessions court after assistant costume designer Anjali Dangle (Meera Chopra) accuses him of rape. In the High Court, senior and talented criminal barrister Tarun Saluja (Akshaye Khanna) works hard to punch holes in the accuser's claims, while Hiral Gandhi (Richa Chadda), an utopian and fervent lawyer fighting her first big case, who was once Saluja's trainee, serves as the prosecutor and defence barrister of the claimed victim. Tarun goes by his principle Law is a fact, Justice is abstract and believes that a lawyer should not get emotionally involved in a case or get into an ethical debate. At a seminar in a flashback, also attended by Hiral, he surmises how justice is left out without proper defence, noting that the pursuit of justice is nothing but a career opportunity for the defence lawyer, prosecution & the judges as well. He summaries this with his line " We're in the business of law, not of Justice". This is completely contrary to Hiral's attitude, as she gets passionately involved in her pursuit to deliver justice. For this very reason, she had to quit Tarun's law firm in the past.

Tarun in his cross-examination exposes tampering of evidence, lies and facts hidden by key witnesses. He proposes the theory that Anjali had a consensual relation with Rohan which started with the pressure of retaining her job, but with time she got emotionally involved in the relationship. Later, when she realises that Rohan is only interested in a physical relationship with her whereas she was expecting him to be her life partner, there is a big argument between the two on this issue. Rohan belittles her and tells her that without him her career is over. Later, Rohan throws her out of his second flat where they pursued their relationship. After a couple of days, Anjali apologises to Rohan & they rekindle their relationship. Later in the day, she reports this incident as rape to police.

Insisting that it is a case of an affair gone sour, Tarun points out that the law does not regard consensual physical relations as rape. Hiral argues that though a couple may have had a consensual relationship in the past, any subsequent sexual encounter without consent of the girl is rape. The case disputes the legal provisions of the penal code 375 that defines conditions under which a sexual offence can be defined as rape.

The judges are put in a tough spot because on one hand, it is clear that Anjali had filed this case to avenge her humiliation, and on the other hand, there is a strong public perception that rich and influential people are exploiting the underprivileged. The two judges deliberate on the case in their chamber. A judgement in favour of Tarun would badly reflect on their credentials, despite circumstantial evidence clearly pointing to fake rape charges. One of the judges peeks from the balcony and sees protests against the accused going out of control, and it is clear what their judgement would be.

The bench, while delivering the verdict accepts the merit of the case presented by Tarun, but public sentiment forces the bench to strictly go by the book and deliver the judgment in line with popular opinion. The judges uphold the session court judgement which states that since there is no evidence of consent or force for this particular incident, the statement of the victim is considered as paramount evidence. Rohan's wife Kainaz indicates to him that she will not aid him anymore, and leaves. Tarun promises Rohan that he will approach the High Court immediately. Rohan is taken to prison, and Anjali confesses in secret to Hiral that what Tarun had said in the court was true and she did this only to get revenge at Rohan. Hiral is shocked by this, and is later invited for dinner by Tarun's family. Tarun once again reminds her "We're in the business of law, not of Justice", a principle she has now truly understood.

Cast 
 Akshaye Khanna as Advocate Tarun Saluja, defence barrister of the accused
 Richa Chadda as Advocate Hiral Gandhi, The public prosecutor
 Meera Chopra as Victim Anjali Vasudev Dangle
 Rahul Bhat as Accused Rohan Ravi Khurana
 Shriswara as Kainaz Khurana, Rohan's wife
 Sandhya Mridul as Shilpa Saluja, Tarun's wife
 Kruttika Desai as Justice Indrani 
 Kishor Kadam as Justice Madgaonkar
 Annuup Choudhari as Pramod Dangle, Anjali's brother
 Tanuka Laghate as Meera Singh
 Kshama Ninave as Mrs. Dangle, Anjali's mother
 Nishank Verma as Shekhar
 Karran Jeet as Hiral's husband (uncredited)
 Riva Arora as Roshini ( Taruns Daughter)

Marketing and release
The first poster of the film was released by its makers on 7 August 2019. On 5 September, a dialogue promo presenting Khanna was released.

The film was premiered at Singapore South Asian International Film Festival (SgSAIFF) on 7 September 2019. It was closing film of the festival and received appreciation. The film was theatrically released in India on 13 September 2019.

Reception

Critical response 

Sreeparna Sengupta of The Times of India gave the film four stars out of five, praising screenplay, dialogues and performance of Akshaye Khanna, Richa Chadha, Rahul Bhat and Kishor Kadam, noted that the film made for a 'gripping watch with a crisp runtime and top-notch performances'. Concluding she wrote, "Overall, Section 375 is an audacious effort. It is a relevant film that tackles a complex issue and one that will engage, inform and open up debates." Trade analyst and critic Taran Adarsh gave the film four stars out of five, tagged it as "Powerful" and praised the performance of Akshaye Khanna, Richa Chadha, writing and direction. He opined, "A relevant film that raises pertinent points... Recommended!" Udita Jhunjhunwala of Firstpost gave three and half stars out of five and opined that it was the cinematography and editing that kept the film moving at desirable pace and in mood. Praising Manish Gupta’s  writing, she concluded that the film neither took a shrill, moralistic stand, nor caved to 'Bollywood-ised courtroom hysteria', rather it stuck to a highly charged narrative that deftly examined both sides of the case and  deferred to the rule of law.

Devesh Sharma reviewing for Filmfare rates the film with three stars out of five. He wrote that the film was a 'well-crafted', 'well-acted' film with pithy and witty dialogues. He praised performance of Khanna and Chadha, but criticising the climax, concluded, "This criminal twist at the very end undoes all the good done by the film and leaves you with a bitter taste in the mouth. The director is trying to be too clever here but this cleverness eats away into the nobility of the film." Manjusha Radhakrishnan of Gulf News gave three and half stars out of five, concurring in praising lead cast she wrote, "Both Khanna and Chadha are in top form as warring legal counsels". She also praised the editing of the film and noted that film was off-beat, but concurring with Sharma she felt that the second half was made 'frustratingly convenient'. Concluding she opined, "While you may not be thrilled at where the film is headed, the right thing to do is to give the searing Section 375 a fair trial."<ref>{{cite news|url=https://gulfnews.com/going-out/movie-reviews/section-375-review-richa-chaddha-legal-drama-deserves-a-fair-trial-1.66369212|title=Section 375' review: Richa Chaddha legal drama deserves a fair trial|last=Radhakrishnan|first=Manjusha|date=12 September 2019|work=Gulf News|access-date=13 September 2019}}</ref> Writing for News18, Rajeev Masand termed the film as an 'unmistakably compelling courtroom drama' and rated it with three and half stars out of five. He noted that director Ajay Bahl and writer Manish Gupta have made a 'sharp, thought-provoking drama' which is topical and conscious of the situation prevailing. Concluding, he opined, "It’s a well-made film with a persuasive argument that is nevertheless disturbing."

 See also 
 False accusation of rape
 Dafaa 302 Article 15''
 Aligarh (film)
 Vaashi (2022 Film)

References

External links 
 
 
 

2010s Hindi-language films
Indian courtroom films
Films about social issues in India
T-Series (company) films
Indian drama films
2019 drama films
Hindi-language drama films
Indian legal films
Films about Bollywood
Films about sex crimes
Films about sexism
Films about sexual abuse
Films about sexual harassment
Films about violence against women
Films about rape in India
Indian films about revenge
Indian Penal Code
Films about lawsuits
Films about lawyers
Films about miscarriage of justice